Diane Langton (born 31 May 1947) is an English actress and singer, known for playing Marlena "Nana" McQueen in Hollyoaks from 2007 to 2009 and 2012 onwards.

Career
Langton has appeared in numerous television series. In the 1980s, she appeared in Only Fools and Horses as June Snell, a former girlfriend of Del Boy. She also appeared in The Rag Trade as Kathy Roberts, EastEnders as Cindy Beale's mother, Bev Williams, in Heartbeat as Ruby Rowan, Nick Berry's character's mother, and as a prostitute in an episode of Joking Apart. Her other notable TV appearances have included Alas Smith and Jones, Bergerac, Minder, Carry On Laughing and The Bill. She also had her own special called Let There Be Langton. She played Private Alice Easy in the 1976 film Carry On England.  She appeared in The Green Tie on the Little Yellow Dog, which was recorded 1982, and broadcast by Channel 4 in 1983.

Langton, who began her career as a dancer, is a popular theatre actress and singer, having appeared in the West End, in A Chorus Line, Pippin, I'm Getting My Act Together, A Little Night Music, Chicago and Mary Poppins.  Her long stage career began with an appearance in Hair, in 1968. In 1982 she appeared in the Royal Variety Performance, performing a song from Show Boat.  In 1987, she created the role of Angel in Kander & Ebb's The Rink at the Forum Theatre in Manchester, a role which she reprised in the 1988 West End transfer.  She returned to the show in 2004, at the Belgrade Theatre in Coventry, this time playing the role of Angel's mother, Anna. In 2010, she joined the London cast of Billy Elliot as Grandma.

Filmography

References

External links
 

1947 births
Living people
People from Somerset
English television actresses
English film actresses
English stage actresses